Pavitr Gajaseni (also spelled Kachasanee; 13 October 1932 – February 2015) was a Thai businessman and sports shooter. He was a great-grandson of Prince Kaew Nawarat of Chiang Mai. He was a partner and director of Sony Thai Co. Ltd, and was a founding member of the Skeet & Trap Shooting Association of Thailand. He competed at the 1968 Summer Olympics and the 1976 Summer Olympics. He also competed at the 1974 Asian Games.

References

External links
 

1932 births
2015 deaths
Pavitr Gajaseni
Pavitr Gajaseni
Pavitr Gajaseni
Shooters at the 1968 Summer Olympics
Shooters at the 1976 Summer Olympics
Pavitr Gajaseni
Asian Games medalists in shooting
Shooters at the 1974 Asian Games
Shooters at the 1978 Asian Games
Medalists at the 1974 Asian Games
Medalists at the 1978 Asian Games
Pavitr Gajaseni
Pavitr Gajaseni
Pavitr Gajaseni